Palimos ng Pag-ibig is a 1986 Filipino drama film directed by Eddie Garcia. The film was based on the 1970 movie The Baby Maker that was initially adapted by Nerissa Cabral into a Komiks series.

The film was adapted into a teleserye of the same title in 2007 for the first installment of Sineserye Presents.

Plot
On the outside, married couple Fina (Santos) and Rodel (Manzano) Alcaraz appear to be a match made in heaven, but behind the thick walls of their home, their relationship is on the verge of crumbling. Despite being relatively affluent, the couple is empty as they are childless, for any attempt to conceive might prove fatal to Fina due to her condition. In an act of desperation, Rodel takes matters into his own hands and seeks the services of a surrogate, Ditas (Bonnevie).

The plan goes awry when Rodel becomes genuinely attracted to the younger and more alluring Ditas. The surrogate, who has lived a destitute life, finds the notion of prosperity equally irresistible. The well-intentioned plan to resuscitate life back into a dying marriage becomes its undoing.

Cast
Vilma Santos as Fina Alcaraz
Edu Manzano as Rodel Alcaraz  
Dina Bonnevie as Ditas
Laurice Guillen as Mitos
Pepito Rodriguez as Reggie Alcaraz
Ronald Corveau as Paul
Cherie Gil as Verna Castillo
Josephine Estrada
Tina Loy
Aurora Yumol
Vic Ordoñez
Ernie Sarate 
Encar Benedicto
Joel Llorca as Reggie (2 years old)
Quinet Morato as Reggie (10 months old)
Rachel Millard as Pearly

Production
Palimos ng Pag-ibig is an adaptation of the 1971 film The Baby Maker, co-written and directed by James Bridges. It was first serialized in Komiks by Nerissa Cabral before it was adapted for film.

Home media
The film was re-released on video by Viva Video in early 1999.

TV adaptation

In 2007, ABS-CBN remade the film into a TV series as the first installment of Sineserye Presents. It stars Kristine Hermosa as Ditas, Diether Ocampo as Rodel and Rica Peralejo as Fina.

In popular culture
The film was the origin of the line, "Para kang karenderiáng bukás sa lahát ng gustong kumain!" ("You're like an eatery open to anyone who wants to eat!"). The line refers to a character accusing another of engaging in prostitution.

References

External links

1986 films
Films about surrogacy
Philippine remakes of foreign films
Philippine drama films
1980s pregnancy films
1980s Tagalog-language films
Viva Films films